Tamil Nadu Sugar Corporation Limited (TASCO) is a state-government undertaking of the Government of Tamil Nadu located in the Indian state of Tamil Nadu. It is a producer of sugar, molasses and power.

History
  Tamil Nadu Sugar Corporation Limited (TASCO) is incorporated on 1974 for take over and operate existing troubled sugar producers

TASCO Operation
Tamil Nadu Sugar Corporation Limited (TASCO) has two plants Arignar Anna Sugar Mills and Madura Sugars (shut down).

Madura Sugars Mills

 Location - Pandiyarajapuaram,  Madurai
 Status - Closed for long time due to low sugar cane receiving

Arignar Anna Sugar Mills
Subsidiary of Tamil Nadu Sugar Corporation Limited (TASCO)
 Location - Kurungulam Melpathy, Thanjavur Taluk, Thanjavur District
 Commencement - 1976 - 1977
 Capacity - 2500 TCD

Perambalur Sugar Mills
 Perambalur Sugar Mills is sugar mill of Perambalur Sugar Mills Limited, a Subsidiary of Tamil Nadu Sugar Corporation Limited (TASCO) 
 Location - Eraiyur, Permbalur
 Commencement - 1975
 Capacity - 2500 TCD

References

The Tamil Nadu sugar corporations

External links 
 TASCO - Official Website
 Arignar Anna Sugar Mills - Official Website
 Perambalur Sugar Mills Limited - Official Website

Companies based in Chennai
Sugar companies of India
Government-owned companies of India
Indian companies established in 1974
1974 establishments in Tamil Nadu